Buck McKenna was a Canadian football coach who was the head coach of Toronto Argonauts from 1929–1932.

References

Sportspeople from Ontario
Toronto Argonauts coaches
Year of birth missing
Year of death missing